Fritz Gassmann (1899–1990) was a Swiss mathematician and geophysicist.

Life
His Ph.D. advisors at ETH Zurich were George Pólya and Hermann Weyl. He was a geophysics professor at the ETH Zurich.

Legacy
Gassmann is the eponym for the Gassmann triple and Gassmann's equation.

Selected publications
Gassmann, Fritz (1951). Über die Elastizität poröser Medien. Viertel. Naturforsch. Ges. Zürich, 96, 1 – 23. (English translation available as pdf here).

References

Gerald L. Alexanderson, "The Random Walks of George Pólya". Mathematical Association of America, 1999. 303pp. .

External links
ETH Zurich Webpage
1951 Photo

1899 births
1990 deaths
20th-century Swiss mathematicians
Number theorists
Swiss geophysicists
Academic staff of ETH Zurich
ETH Zurich alumni